William Mahoney (1 January 1885 – 26 November 1939) was an Australian rules footballer who played for the Geelong Football Club in the VFL in 1902 and for the St Kilda Football Club between 1904 and 1905.  He then played for the Richmond Football Club in the VFA in 1906 and 1907 then in the VFL on and off between 1908 and 1920.

References 

 Hogan P: The Tigers Of Old, Richmond FC, Melbourne 1996

External links

1885 births
1939 deaths
Australian rules footballers from Geelong
Australian Rules footballers: place kick exponents
Geelong Football Club players
St Kilda Football Club players
Richmond Football Club players
Richmond Football Club (VFA) players